In Tasmania, Highway 1 is a  long route that connects Hobart to the state's north coast, and to Launceston via a  long spur. Highway 1 also exists on the mainland of Australia, linking the state capitals via a circular route around the coastline. All roads within the Highway 1 system are allocated a road route numbered 1, M1, A1, or B1, depending on the state route numbering system. In Tasmania the highway is designated as National Highway 1, though all other routes in the state are alphanumeric.

History

Highway 1 was created as part of the National Route Numbering system, adopted in 1955. The route was compiled from an existing network of state and local roads and tracks.

Route description
From this point the Midland Highway becomes Route 1 and travels over the River Derwent and passes through the newly constructed Brighton Bypass before continuing north towards Launceston. South of Launceston, Highway 1 continues west as the Bass Highway to Deloraine, after which it travels north to Devonport, and then west along the northern coast to the route's terminus in Burnie. The Bass Highway, however, continues towards Marrawah on the state's west coast.

Major intersections
  Lyell Highway
  Highland Lake Road
  Esk Highway
  West Tamar Highway

References

See also

 Highway 1 (Northern Territory)
 Highway 1 (New South Wales)
 Highway 1 (Queensland)
 Highway 1 (South Australia)
 Highway 1 (Victoria)
 Highway 1 (Western Australia)

Highways in Tasmania